Girl Meets World is an American comedy television series created by Michael Jacobs and April Kelly that premiered on Disney Channel on June 27, 2014. The series ran for three seasons, consisting of 72 episodes, and concluded on January 20, 2017. The series is a spinoff of Boy Meets World and stars Rowan Blanchard, Ben Savage, Sabrina Carpenter, Peyton Meyer, August Maturo, Danielle Fishel, and Corey Fogelmanis.

The series centers around the life of Riley and her friends and family, particularly their school life, in which Cory is their history teacher. Riley shares a strong relationship with her best friend Maya Hart, who assists her in learning to cope with social and personal issues of adolescence. Several Boy Meets World cast members reprise their roles in the series.

Premise 
It has been several years since Cory and Topanga Matthews moved to New York City. The series follows their daughter, Riley Matthews, and her best friend, Maya Hart, as they navigate challenges of life and school. Following along with them are their classmates Lucas Friar and Farkle Minkus and Riley's younger brother Auggie.

Episodes

Cast  

 Rowan Blanchard as Riley Matthews
 Ben Savage as Cory Matthews
 Sabrina Carpenter as Maya Hart
 Peyton Meyer as Lucas Friar
 August Maturo as Auggie Matthews
 Danielle Fishel as Topanga Matthews
 Corey Fogelmanis as Farkle Minkus

Production

Development 
In November 2012, it was reported that Disney Channel was in the early stages of development of a follow-up series titled Girl Meets World, which would center on Cory and Topanga's 12-year-old daughter Riley. The original idea for the series was developed by Corey Marsh, an executive director at Disney Channel, who approached Michael Jacobs, co-creator of Boy Meets World, to produce a similar series for a new generation of children as executive producer and showrunner. The idea was to create a modern version of the show from a different perspective to the original. On November 26, 2012, it was confirmed by Ben Savage and Danielle Fishel that they would be reprising their roles as Cory Matthews and Topanga Lawrence-Matthews in the series. In February 2013, it was announced that Michael Jacobs had reached out to all of the former Boy Meets World cast members to take part in the new series. On June 17, 2013, Disney Channel officially greenlit a series order for Girl Meets World, which began production that summer. On January 23, 2014, the first season order was increased from its initial 13-episode count to 20 in order to make a full season. On May 2, 2014, a full trailer for Girl Meets World was released. On May 21, 2014, the pilot episode became available as a preview to users on the various Watch Disney Channel mobile and television apps which require TV Everywhere authentication to watch. Following the TV premiere of the pilot, the episode "Girl Meets Sneak Attack" was made available via the apps. On June 13, 2014, the pilot was made available for free on iTunes. On August 6, 2014, Girl Meets World was renewed for a second season by Disney Channel. The second season premiered on May 11, 2015. The third season of Girl Meets World was announced on November 25, 2015. The third season premiered on June 3, 2016.

Casting 
Auditions began in mid-November 2012 for the lead roles of Riley Matthews, the daughter of Cory and Topanga, Maya, a witty friend of Riley's who has a troubled past, and Elliot, Riley's older brother. By the end of January 2013, Rowan Blanchard and Sabrina Carpenter were cast as Riley and Maya, respectively. Teo Halm was tapped for the role of Elliot in early March. Filming of the pilot began on March 20, 2013, and concluded on March 22, 2013. Rider Strong and Will Friedle made a surprise visit to the set, sparking rumors of a return, or at least a cameo appearance, in the upcoming series. Maitland Ward also made a visit to the set and was asked about the return of her character, Rachel McGuire. Ward said, "I can't really share any show info, but it would be fun if the old gang got back together again!" On October 5, 2013, Teo Halm announced on Twitter that he was no longer involved with the series. A report by TVLine suggested the series was undergoing creative changes after the pilot and his character was ultimately written out of the series. On March 12, 2014, it was announced that Lee Norris would reprise his role of Stuart Minkus. On March 18, 2014, it was announced that Rider Strong would reprise his role of Shawn Hunter. On December 3, 2014, it was announced that Will Friedle would reprise his role of Eric Matthews, beginning with the second season, along with William Daniels reprising his role as George Feeny in a larger role. On February 3, 2015, it was announced that Trina McGee would reprise her role as Angela Moore and Blake Clark would reprise his role of Chet Hunter. On April 7, 2015, it was announced that Anthony Tyler Quinn would reprise his role as Jonathan Turner. On June 5, 2015, it was announced that Matthew Lawrence would reprise his role as Jack Hunter. On April 1, 2016, it was announced that Reginald VelJohnson would guest star in an episode as a police officer, a nod to VelJohnson's previous role in a different TGIF sitcom, officer Carl Winslow of Family Matters. On July 28, 2016, it was announced that Lily Nicksay and Lindsay Ridgeway, both of whom portrayed Morgan Matthews, would appear in the season three finale.

Ending 
On January 4, 2017, the series' writers stated on their group Twitter account that they were informed by Disney Channel that the series would not be renewed for a fourth season. Viewers of the series led a fan campaign appealing to Netflix to renew the program, noting that as the characters aged, the show was beginning to outgrow Disney Channel's target demographic. Jacobs expressed "I don't think Girl should have been cancelled" and stated he would be interested in continuing the series, revealing that the process was in its "beginning stages" with "interested platforms". The cancellation of the series sparked attention in the media. Janelle Okwodu of Vogue reported that the announcement "sent shockwaves through social media—in part because it meant one less realistic depiction on-screen of what it is to be a young woman". Of the series, TVLine reporter Andy Swift suggested that it "maybe shouldn’t have been canceled so soon into its run", and Brandon Katz of Forbes commented "the series laid out countless positive moral lessons for its young viewers". Bustle reporter Sabienna Bowman described the program as a "landmark show", stating, "Girl Meets World captured the hearts of the bright, socially aware generation who have grown up in the age of social media", while commending how it dealt with issues centered around young women.

After four months of searching for a viable network, on May 3, 2017, co-creator Jacobs confirmed that he was unable to come to an agreement with any outlet to continue the show, thus effectively ending the series.

Broadcast 
The series originally premiered in the United States on Disney Channel and in Canada on Family Channel on June 27, 2014. The series premiered on Disney Channel in Australia on August 25, 2014, and in the United Kingdom and Ireland on August 29, 2014. In the Balkan countries, Greece, the Middle East and Africa, the series began airing on Disney Channel on November 15, 2014. The series started airing on Disney Channel in Canada on September 1, 2015; the episode "Girl Meets I Am Farkle" premiered on Disney Channel in Canada on September 3, 2015, which was before its initial airing in the U.S. on September 11, 2015. In India, the series premiered on October 30, 2017 on Disney International HD.

Reception

Critical 
Review aggregator Rotten Tomatoes gives the series an 84% approval rating based on reviews from 19 critics. The site's consensus states: "Though not quite as comical, Girl Meets World sweetly shares the nostalgia of its predecessor, Boy Meets World, with its young audience while providing positive moral values for today's youth." Metacritic gives the series a score of 64 based on reviews from 10 critics, indicating "generally favorable reviews". The series premiere received positive reviews. Kevin Fallon of The Daily Beast called it a "perfectly pleasant Disney Channel show". Rob Owen of Pittsburgh Post-Gazette said it was "a cute half-hour that capably introduces new characters and sets the table for the new series". Diane Werts of Newsday said the series "does its job of bringing tween-based family viewing into the 2010s".

Ratings 
 

| link2             = List of Girl Meets World episodes#Season 2 (2015–16)
| episodes2         = 30
| start2            = 
| end2              = 
| startrating2      = 2.05
| endrating2        = 1.70
| viewers2          = |2}} 

| link3             = List of Girl Meets World episodes#Season 3 (2016–17)
| episodes3         = 21
| start3            = 
| end3              = 
| startrating3      = 1.89
| endrating3        = 1.64
| viewers3          = |2}} 
}}

Awards and nominations

References

External links 
 
 
 Girl Meets World on Disney+

2010s American children's comedy television series
2014 American television series debuts
2017 American television series endings
Boy Meets World
Disney Channel original programming
English-language television shows
Television series about families
Television series by It's a Laugh Productions
Television series created by Michael Jacobs